Günther Storck (2 October 1938 – 23 April 1993) was a Traditionalist Catholic bishop from Germany.

Biography

Early life
Günther Storck was born on 2 October 1938 in Borken, North Rhine-Westphalia, as the youngest child of the Storck family, who ran a craft business. The father died early, so that the mother not only had to take charge of the family, but also had to run the business. The young Günther Storck was regarded as mentally very sensitive and highly gifted.

Academic career
After his Abitur (1958) he studied classical philology and German studies at universities in Münster, Berlin and Munich. For his vocation to the priesthood he returned to Münster, his bishop's resident city, where he started a degree in theology at the seminary  (1962). In the meanwhile he passed his state examination in philology, philosophy and theology. He escaped from the beginning influence of Vatican II on Münster – Karl Rahner, the former council adviser to Cardinal Julius Döpfner, took over the chair in dogmatic theology and history of dogma at the University of Münster (1967-1971), that Joseph Ratzinger had recently vacated (1963-1966) – to Munich (1967), where he continued his studies at the theological and philosophical faculties of the University of Munich. Few years later he became Research Associate of Leo Scheffczyk, which meant that Cardinal Döpfner's allowance to become ordained to the priesthood in the Roman Catholic Archdiocese of Munich and Freising became a remote likelihood, which is why he switched to Egg in Switzerland for ordination (21 September 1973). The day after he celebrated his First Mass in Damenstiftskirche St. Anna. He did his doctorate in theology with a tripartite graduate thesis on Johann Gottlieb Fichte's Wissenschaftslehre of 1794/95 (first part) and on his Wissenschaftslehre of 1804 (second part); its concluding third part achieves the theological application to the doctrine of the Trinity.

Death and afterward
Although many were concerned about the poor health of Bishop Günther Storck - he had been lying in a Munich hospital after a collapse for about a month - so the news of his death on 23 April came as a surprise to outsiders. There was a prospect of improvement and arrangements had already been made for a subsequent spa stay. But it turned out differently. Bishop Storck had internal bleeding that could no longer be stopped. Informed about the possibility of premature death, his priests had gathered at his deathbed and a small circle of people who had been especially close to him lately. On Friday, April 30, the solemn requiem was held for the deceased in St. Mary's Church, Munich – exactly nine years after his consecration as bishop. On the following Monday, 3 May, the funeral took place at the Munich West Cemetery.

The first review of Storck's thesis appeared twenty years after its publication (see § Secondary literature). Seven additional years later, his teacher in philosophy resumed Storck's application of transcendental philosophy to the Trinity Doctrine, claiming that "the absolute difference between the Godmanhood of Jesus and the pure essence of God should have been worked out": "Godmanhood is not simply the same as the Godhead." Which eventually is confirmed by a revisionist reading of the Islamic view in Quran 5:116–117: "One notices the reference to Matthew 24:36: »Yet no one knows the day or hour when this will be, not the angels in heaven, nor the Son. Only the Father knows.«"

Bibliography

Primary literature

Secondary literature

References

External links 
    Retrieved 2019-01-03.
 

1938 births
1993 deaths
People from Borken, North Rhine-Westphalia
Academic staff of the Ludwig Maximilian University of Munich
20th-century German theologians
German idealism
Idealists
Thục line bishops
20th-century German Roman Catholic bishops
20th-century German Roman Catholic priests